Harold Janeway (February 3, 1936 – August 20, 2020) was an American politician who served as a Democratic member of the New Hampshire Senate, representing the 7th District from 2006 to 2010. He was founder and president at White Mountain Investment, Inc, a director at the New Hampshire Charitable Foundation, and a Trustee of Milton Academy.

He died of cancer on August 20, 2020, in Webster, New Hampshire at age 84.

References

External links
The New Hampshire Senate - Senator Harold Janeway official NH Senate website
Project Vote Smart - Senator Harold Janeway (NH) profile
Follow the Money - Harold Janeway
2006 campaign contributions
New Hampshire Senate Democratic Caucus - Harold Janeway profile

1936 births
2020 deaths
Politicians from Glen Cove, New York
Democratic Party New Hampshire state senators